Salo "Sol" Kimel (7 October 1928 – 14 August 2021) was an Israeli chemical physicist. He was a professor at Technion – Israel Institute of Technology and performed research into biomedical applications of lasers.

Biography
Kimel was born on 7 October 1928 in Berlin, Brandenburg, Prussia, Germany. During his childhood in Amsterdam, the Netherlands, he was friends with Anne Frank. In 1942, his mother was taken in a Nazi razzia. Kimel subsequently went into hiding on a farm. In early 1945 the farm was raided by Nazi authorities and Kimel was sent to Westerbork transit camp where he remained until the liberation of the camp on 12 April 1945. In 1960 he obtained his PhD in physics from the University of Amsterdam under professor Jan Ketelaar with a thesis titled: "Optical dispersion of gases in the infrared region : the dispersion through the first overtone band of HCI".

Kimel was elected a corresponding member of the Royal Netherlands Academy of Arts and Sciences in 1989. Kimel died on 14 August 2021 at the age 92.

References

1928 births
2021 deaths
People from Berlin
Israeli chemists
Laser researchers
Members of the Royal Netherlands Academy of Arts and Sciences
Scientists from Berlin
Academic staff of Technion – Israel Institute of Technology
University of Amsterdam alumni
German emigrants to the Netherlands
Dutch emigrants to Israel
Israeli people of German-Jewish descent